is a Japanese actress and former bodybuilder, singer, idol and professional wrestler.

Saiki was trained for a career in pro wrestling in the Wrestle-1 dojo under Akira Nogami and Kaz Hayashi, and made her debut in March 2016. In June of the same year, Saiki debuted in Tokyo Joshi Pro, eventually signing with the promotion later in the year. Outside of professional wrestling, she was also a member of Wrestle-1's cheerleading squad, Cheer♡1, and a member of idol duo Deadlift Lolita with fellow wrestler Ladybeard.

Professional wrestling career

Wrestle-1 (2015–2019) 
Saiki initially joined Wrestle-1 as a member of Cheer♡1, a dance group that performed during and before Wrestle-1 shows. Eventually she began training for a career in professional wrestling in late 2015, joining Wrestle-1's dojo where she trained under Kaz Hayashi and Akira Nogami. She made her debut for the company in March 2016, defeating Hana Kimura. After she began competing for Tokyo Joshi Pro-Wrestling, Saiki's appearances in W-1 became more sporadic, however, she continued to make appearances for the promotion until August 2019.

Tokyo Joshi Pro-Wrestling (2016–2019) 

In June 2016, she began competing for Tokyo Joshi Pro Wrestling, a sister company of DDT Pro Wrestling. At DDT's Peter Pan event on August 28, she took part in a battle royal for the Ironman Heavymetalweight Championship, but was unsuccessful. On October 9, she faced veteran Kyoko Kimura in a losing effort. On March 12, 2017, Saiki received her first opportunity at the Tokyo Princess Of Princess Championship, unsuccessfully challenging Yuu. In July 2017, she took part in the Tokyo Princess Cup, defeating Yuu for the first time in the second round. She eventually made it to the final, where she defeated Yuka Sakazaki to win the tournament. On August 26, Saiki defeated Sakazaki once again to win the Tokyo Princess of Princess Championship, the first championship of her career. She made her first successful defence on September 30, defeating Mizuki and once again successfully defended it on November 3 against Rika Tatsumi. She lost the championship to Miyu Yamashita in her third defense on January 4, 2018. On May 3, 2018, Saiki and Marika Kobashi, as "Muscle JK Strikers", defeated Neo Biishiki-gun (Saki-sama and Azusa Christie) to win the Princess Tag Team Championship for the first time. However, they were forced to relinquish the titles later due to Marika sustaining an injury that forced her out of competition for a while. Upon Kobashi's return to the ring, they were unsuccessful in their bid to win the titles back from Mizuki and Yuka Sakazaki on February 23, 2019. On August 14, she defeated Saori Anou to win Actwres girl'Z's AgZ Championship, becoming the second holder of the title. Her reign would be short-lived, however, as she would suffer a broken jaw competing for AWG on August 29, and would vacate the championship the following month.

Retirement 

Following her injury, and in spite of a full recovery, Saiki became inactive and did not wrestle for over two years in the aftermath. In March 26, 2022, she formally announced her retirement from both pro wrestling and bodybuilding, citing her wish to pursue a career in acting. She retired from bodybuilding 5 days after the announcement, on March 31. Her retirement match took place on May 3 at Tokyo Joshi Pro-Wrestling's "Yes! Wonderland" event. The 3-minute exhibition match against Arisu Endo ended in a time-limit draw.

Other media 

Outside of professional wrestling, Saiki was a member of the kawaii metal group Deadlift Lolita with fellow wrestler Ladybeard.

On November 21, 2022, her autobiography, Muscle Graduation - Be True to Yourself, was released.

Championships and accomplishments 
 Actwres girl'Z
 AgZ Championship (1 time)
 Tokyo Joshi Pro Wrestling
 Tokyo Princess Cup (2017)
 Tokyo Princess of Princess Championship (1 time)
 Tokyo Princess Tag Team Championship (1 time) – with Marika Kobashi

Bibliography

References

External links 

 

1992 births
Japanese female bodybuilders
Japanese female idols
Japanese female professional wrestlers
Keio University alumni
Living people
Sportspeople from Saitama (city)
21st-century professional wrestlers